The Yle tax is a Finnish tax collected to fund the operation of the country's public broadcasting company, Yle. The tax has been collected since 2013, when it replaced the television licence payment (televisiomaksu, televisionsavgift). Rates vary from 140 to 3000 euros a year, depending on the amount of taxable income an organization has.

See also 
 Finnish Government

References 

Tax
Economy of Finland
Tax